The Nationaal Luchtvaart-Themapark Aviodrome (also known simply as Aviodrome) is a large aerospace museum in the Netherlands that has been located on Lelystad Airport since 2003. Previously the museum was located at Schiphol Airport.

History

In 1955 several organisations, such as the airline KLM and aircraft manufacturer Fokker, initiated a foundation called "Stichting voor het Nationaal Luchtvaartmuseum" with the single goal of creating a national aviation museum.

The first installment of this aviation museum opened its doors in 1960 at Schiphol airport under the name Aeroplanorama and had only seven aircraft on display. It closed its doors in 1967 and a new museum called Aviodome was opened in 1971 at Schiphol. The main building was a large aluminium geodesic dome designed by Buckminster Fuller, the largest in the world at the time, which housed most of the aircraft on display. Hence the 'dome' in the name Aviodome.

Over time, the location became too small for the growing aircraft collection and in 2003 the museum was moved to a new location on Lelystad Airport. The building at Schiphol was demolished and the name was changed to Aviodrome. On the current location, it has three buildings: the main building where most of the aircraft on display are located and where there's a restaurant and a cinema, a replica of the old Schiphol terminal building from 1928 and a hangar for aircraft storage with limited access for visitors. Added to the aviation theme were several artifacts from several Dutch space programs, such as the backup flight-article of ANS (Astronomical Netherlands Satellite), a mockup of IRAS and the high-speed windtunnel model of the Huygens probe. In doing so the aviation museum became an aerospace museum.

Due to bankruptcy, the museum closed on 25 December 2011, but it reopened on 28 April 2012 after a takeover by the Libéma Group.

Collection

Aircraft collection
Note that not all aircraft listed are currently on display or even present at the museum. The museum also frequently houses or is visited by aircraft that are not owned by the museum. 
 Aérospatiale Dauphin 2
 Agusta - Bell 204B UH-1
 Alsema Sagitta
 ANR-1 airship gondola
 Antonov An-2
 Auster J.1 Autocrat
 BAC Jet Provost (cockpit only)
 B.A.T. F.K.23 Bantam
 4x balloon basket

 Ballooncapsule Dutch Viking
 Beechcraft D-18, used in the James Bond movie Octopussy
 Birdman Cherokee
 Blackburn Buccaneer (cockpit only)
 Blériot XI
 Boeing 747-200 Louis Blériot
 Bölkow Bo 105
 Cierva C.30A Autogiro
 Consolidated PBY5A Catalina
 Cessna 172 (still active for aerial photography)
 De Havilland Canada Beaver (cockpit only)
 De Havilland DH.82A Tiger Moth
 2x De Havilland DH.104 Dove (one complete and one cockpit)
 DFS Olympia
 2x Douglas C-47 Skytrain
 2x Douglas DC-2 (one flying, the other in bad state and incomplete)
 Douglas DC-3
 Douglas DC-4 Skymaster
 Evans VP-1 Volksplane
 V-1 "Flying bomb" (model)
 Firebird ultralight
 2x Fokker Spin
 Fokker Dr.I
 Fokker F.2
 Fokker B-4A (incomplete)
 Fokker C-5D
 Fokker F-7a
 Fokker F-8 "Duif"
 Fokker S-4 (incomplete)
 4 x Fokker S-11 instructors (used in airshows)
 Fokker S-12
 Fokker S-13 (tailpiece only)
 Fokker S-14 machtrainer
 2x Fokker F-27 Friendship (one still airworthy)
 Fokker F-27-050 (F-50 prototype based on F-27)
 Fokker 100
 Mock-up cockpit Fokker 100
 Fouga Magister (flying)
 2x Grumman S2N Tracker
 Grunau Baby

 Hawker Sea Fury
 Hawker Hunter Mk.4
 Hawker Sea Hawk
 Junkers Ju 52 (license built by CASA)
 Lilienthal Gleitflugzeug (German for glider) replica
 Lockheed L-749 Constellation
 2x Lockheed F-104 Starfighter
 Lockheed SP2H Neptune
 MiG-21 PFM Fishbed-F
 2x Mignet HM-14 Pou du Ciel
 N.H.I. H.2 Kolibri
 N.H.I. H.3 Kolibri
 Noorduyn C-64 Norseman (in restoration)
 Noorduyn Harvard
 North American B.25 Mitchell (incomplete)
 Pander Zögling
 Piper J-3 Cub
 Raytheon Hawk missile
 Rienks R-1B giroglider
 Rogallo sailplane "Engel" prototype
 Rogallo sailplane Penguin
 Rogallo sailplane La Mouette Cobra
 Saab 91D Safir
 Saab Viggen

 3x Schleicher Ka-4 Rhönlerche (only one in good condition)
 Schleicher Ka-8B
 Sikorski S-55
 3x Stearman Hammond Y-1S
 Sud Aviation SE.210 Caravelle (cockpit only)
 Supermarine Spitfire (replica)
 Van Ommeren VO-3
 Westland WS-51 Dragonfly
 Wright Flyer replica

Space collection
 Astronomical Netherlands Satellite (backup flight-article)
 Infrared Astronomy Satellite - IRAS (mockup partially built from structural spares)
 Huygens probe (windtunnel model)

Noteworthy projects

Jumbo's touchdown 

In 2004 the last of KLM's classic Boeing 747-200's named Louis Blériot was sold to the Aviodrome for the symbolic amount of 1 euro. Though the aircraft could still fly, Lelystad Airport was too small to handle such a large aircraft so the aircraft was partially disassembled and moved over water on a barge with the wings, engines and empennage removed and stored alongside the fuselage so the aircraft could fit under bridges along the way. After the journey over water that attracted a lot of attention the aircraft was lifted from the barge at Harderwijk and the last bit of the trip took place over land. At its final location the aircraft was re-assembled and opened to the public. The tail was fitted with a top beacon since, technically, the Boeing now is a building.

Connie's comeback 
Perhaps one of the most spectacular pieces in the collection of the Aviodrome is the Lockheed L-749 Constellation, often just called Connie. After several years of restoration work it was flown over to the Netherlands in 2002 from the United States where it had been in storage. More work, including a new paint job, was done to the aircraft in the Netherlands but the aircraft suffered from engine problems in 2004. To resolve this, two replacement engines coming from the Korean Air museum were fitted. However, it hasn't flown since 2004, performances by the aircraft being limited to engine runs only.

De Uiver 

De Uiver was the name of a Douglas DC-2 that placed second in the 1934 MacRobertson Air Race, only being beaten by a purpose built de Havilland DH.88 racer Grosvenor House.  The real Uiver, which is an old Dutch word for Stork, no longer exists. The Aviodrome owns one of the last still airworthy DC-2s in the world. This DC-2 is a former US Navy aircraft painted in the Uiver's original KLM colors. After an unexpected gear collapse the aircraft suffered some minor damage, but after the needed funds were raised the aircraft was repaired.

Fokker Friendship 
The Fokker F-27 Friendship was Fokker's best selling aircraft model of all time. Production of this first post-war Fokker airliner started in 1955 and many of them are still in service today. The Aviodrome purchased the oldest still flying series produced F-27 from its Australian owner in 2004 and painted it in the colors of the no longer existing Nederlandse Luchtvaart Maatschappij (NLM). Exactly fifty years after the first flight of the first F-27 on 24 November 1955 this aircraft made a memorial flight as a tribute to fifty years Fokker Friendship.

References

External links

 Aviodrome, official website 

Aerospace museums in the Netherlands
Museums in Flevoland
Buildings and structures in Lelystad